KCLI-FM (99.3 FM) is a radio station broadcasting a news/talk format. Licensed to Cordell, Oklahoma, United States, the station is currently owned by Wright Broadcasting Systems, Inc.

History
The station was assigned the call letters KBOG on October 30, 1985. On October 14, 1988, the station changed its call sign to KRMK, on July 22, 1991, to KCDL, and on September 21, 2010, to the current KCLI-FM. James "Max" Ray Maxey, Jr. used to own this station as Media Max Promotions and he was born on October 10, 1952, in Oklahoma City and died on March 6, 2016, in Oklahoma City, OK.

Previous logo

References

External links

CLI-FM
News and talk radio stations in the United States
Radio stations established in 1985
1985 establishments in Oklahoma